School website is a website built, designed, and maintained by a school. In many legislations, it is a statutory requirement for schools to publish certain information on-line, on their website, or elsewhere.

Overview 
School website software is a specialised form of Content Management System (CMS) hosted on a computer connected to the internet. It is commissioned by the school governors. It is designed and installed by a specialist computer software company. When it has been accepted, the client (the school) is responsible for maintaining the content; adding new content and changing elements of the visual design, the visitor to the site cannot make these changes but accesses the site to read the content. CMS may have additional modules that allow it to do additional tasks- like  mass emailings, online registration for events or even online sales. The sites can be simple and follow proven models, with just the text and the images customised to the schools requirements or bespoke, or part of a larger management suite.
The basic content of the website is to large part by defined by the government. The content of the website must comply with data protection legislation.
A school website addresses these audiences:
Prospective parents and their children – who require information about the school, pastoral care, exam results, admission procedures, open days.
Existing parents – who are looking for day to day information, school calendar, parent portals, news, events, galleries of stay-at-home worksheets
Those monitoring the school- Ofsted and other child care agencies, the national and local press.
Visitors to the school – those requiring, contact details and directions to the school.
Alumni - networking with other old boys, calendars, and news.
Fundraising - giving, legacies and gifts.

Websites cannot be static, legislation changes and also the needs of the school. If the website is being used as a method of school promotion then current style and fashion is important. The rise of mobile phone use among parents means that the site has to be optimised for mobile browsers as well as the laptop or PC.

Legal
The Principal legislation in the UK for state schools and private, or independent schools was the Education and Inspections Act 2006 and its amendments and regulations, such the School Information Regulations 2012 and more importantly the School Information (England) (Amendment) Regulations 2016

The General Data Protection Regulation has applied since 2018, and before that the Data Protection Act and its successor Data Protection Act 2018.

A maintained school in England must display information online.
.
In 2020 this is:

   School contact details
   Admission arrangements
   Ofsted reports
   Exam and assessment results
   Performance tables
   Curriculum
   Behaviour policy
   School complaints procedure
   Pupil premium
   Year 7 literacy and numeracy catch-up premium
   PE and sport premium for primary schools
   Special educational needs (SEN) and disability information
   Careers programme information
   Equality objectives
   Governors’ information and duties
   Charging and remissions policies
   Values and ethos
   Requests for paper copies

These are section headings and within each there is specific information that needs to be published. Ofsted monitors the contents of school websites, and should items be missing an inspection could be triggered.

All establishments in England must register with the Department for Education. They are given an URN (Universal Recognition Number) and will be inspected by Ofsted. Private schools have greater freedom in how they teach  but they still are required to have a website that complies, though the content required will differ from that of a state school or an academy.

Notes

References
 Dange, Markus -  "Create a School Website - how to make a school website with pupils".
Taddeo, Carmel, and Alan Barnes. “The School Website: Facilitating Communication Engagement and Learning - Taddeo - 2016 - British Journal of Educational Technology - Wiley Online Library.” British Journal of Educational Technology, John Wiley & Sons, Ltd (10.1111), 27 Nov. 2014, onlinelibrary.wiley.com/doi/abs/10.1111/bjet.12229.
Reychav, Iris, et al. “Tablet Adoption with Smart School Website Technology.” Taylor & Francis, 13 June 2016, www.tandfonline.com/doi/abs/10.1080/08874417.2016.1163996.

Schools
Educational websites